West Germany sent a delegation to compete at the 1964 Summer Paralympics in Tokyo, Japan. Its athletes finished ninth in the gold and overall medal count.

See also 
 1964 Summer Paralympics medal table
 Germany at the 1964 Summer Olympics

References 

Nations at the 1964 Summer Paralympics
1964
Summer Paralympics
1964 in German sport